Flat beans, also known as helda beans, romano beans (not to be confused with the borlotti bean) and "sem fhali" in some Indian states, are a variety of Phaseolus coccineus, known as runner bean with edible pods that have a characteristic wide and flat shape. Flat beans are normally cooked and served as the whole pods, the same way as other green beans. Like many other types of bean (see broad bean for example) they can also be dehusked or shelled, and the whitish seeds dried and stored, but there is no incentive to grow them for this purpose as higher-yielding bean varieties are available.

Modern flat bean varieties picked while young are stringless. Older varieties, and beans allowed to ripen on the vine, may contain tough strings.

External links
 http://www.thinkvegetables.co.uk/vegetable.asp?VegetableID=9
 Beans, Peas & Lentils
 Types of beans

Pod vegetables
Edible legumes
Edible nuts and seeds
Vegetarian cuisine
Legume dishes